Beta cloth is a type of fireproof silica fiber cloth used in the manufacture of Apollo/Skylab A7L space suits, the Apollo Thermal Micrometeoroid Garment, the McDivitt Purse, and in other specialized applications.

Beta cloth consists of fine woven silica fiber, similar to fiberglass. The resulting fabric does not burn, and melts only at temperatures exceeding . To reduce its tendency to crease or tear when manipulated, and to increase durability, the fibers are coated with Teflon.

Details
The tight weave of Beta cloth makes it more resistant to atomic oxygen exposure. Its ability to resist atomic oxygen exposure means it is commonly used as the outer-most layer of multi-layer insulation for space; it was used on the Space Shuttle and the International Space Station.

It was incorporated into NASA space suits after the deadly 1967 Apollo 1 launch pad fire, in which the astronauts' nylon suits burned through. After the fire, NASA demanded any potentially flammable materials be removed from both the spacecraft and space suits. Beta cloth was developed by a Manned Spacecraft Center team led by Frederick S. Dawn and including Matthew I. Radnofsky working with the Owens-Corning and DuPont companies.

Where additional wear resistance was needed, external patches of Chromel-R metallic cloth were used.

Beta cloth was used as the material for the Skylab shower enclosure.

The interior of the Space Shuttle payload bay was almost completely covered with Beta cloth. This protected it while it was opened for weeks at a time in space.

Beta cloth is used on the Curiosity Mars rover.

See also
 Multi-layer insulation
 Materials for use in vacuum

References

External links

 NASA - Multilayer Insulation Material Guidelines (1999)
 

Apollo program hardware
Flame retardant fabrics
Woven fabrics